Crosbyella spinturnix is a species in the suborder Laniatores ("armoured harvestmen"), in the order Opiliones ("harvestmen").
It is found in North America.

References

Further reading
 Kury, Adriano B. (2003). "Annotated catalogue of the Laniatores of the New World (Arachnida, Opiliones)". Revista Ibérica de Aracnología, volumen especial monográfico, no. 1, 5-337.

External links
NCBI Taxonomy Browser, Crosbyella spinturnix

Harvestmen